Nijemirdum is a village in De Fryske Marren municipality in the province of Friesland, the Netherlands, with a population of around 555 as of 2004.

There is a windmill in the village: 't Zwaantje, which is a monument.

History
The village was first mentioned in 1399 as Nuwe Merden. It uses Nije (new) to distinguish from Oudemirdum. The name "Mirdum" is thought to have originated from the Frisian word "mer" (lake), possibly referring to the nearby Mirnserklif cliffs overlooking the IJsselmeer..  The church dates from 1898, however there is a tower in the cemetery which dates from the 14th century. In 1516, the church which belonged to the tower was destroyed by the Burgundians. It was rebuilt, but became derelict in 1702 and was later demolished.In 1840, it was home to 131 people.

Before 2014, Nijemirdum was part of the Gaasterlân-Sleat municipality and before 1984 it was part of Gaasterland.

Gallery

References

External links

De Fryske Marren
Populated places in Friesland